Alfred Maurice De Araugo (24 May 1902 – 4 April 1966) was an Australian rules footballer who played with South Melbourne and St Kilda in the Victorian Football League (VFL).

Notes

External links 

1902 births
1966 deaths
Australian rules footballers from Bendigo
Sydney Swans players
St Kilda Football Club players
Sandhurst Football Club players